Reincarnation, also known as rebirth, transmigration, or metempsychosis (Greek) is the philosophical or religious concept that the non-physical essence of a living being begins a new life in a different physical form or body after biological death. Resurrection is a similar process hypothesized by some religions in which a soul comes back to life in the same body. In most beliefs involving reincarnation, the soul is seen as immortal and the only thing that becomes perishable is the body. Upon death, the soul becomes transmigrated into a new infant or animal to live again. The term transmigration means passing of soul from one body to another after death.

Reincarnation (Punarjanma) is a central tenet of the Indian religions such as Hinduism, Buddhism, Jainism, and Sikhism; as well as certain Paganist religious groups, although there are Hindu and Buddhist groups who do not believe in reincarnation, instead believing in an afterlife. In various forms, it occurs as an esoteric belief in many streams of Judaism in different aspects, in some beliefs of the Indigenous peoples of the Americas, and some Indigenous Australians (though most believe in an afterlife or spirit world). A belief in rebirth/metempsychosis was held by Greek historical figures, such as Pythagoras, Socrates, and Plato, as well as in various modern religions.

Although the majority of denominations within Christianity and Islam do not believe that individuals reincarnate, particular groups within these religions do refer to reincarnation; these groups include the mainstream historical and contemporary followers of Cathars, Alawites, the Druze, and the Rosicrucians. The historical relations between these sects and the beliefs about reincarnation that were characteristic of Neoplatonism, Orphism, Hermeticism, Manichaenism, and Gnosticism of the Roman era as well as the Indian religions have been the subject of recent scholarly research. In recent decades, many Europeans and North Americans have developed an interest in reincarnation, and many contemporary works mention it.

Conceptual definitions
The word reincarnation derives from a Latin term that literally means 'entering the flesh again'. Reincarnation refers to the belief that an aspect of every human being (or all living beings in some cultures) continues to exist after death. This aspect may be the soul or mind or consciousness or something transcendent which is reborn in an interconnected cycle of existence; the transmigration belief varies by culture, and is envisioned to be in the form of a newly born human being, or animal, or plant, or spirit, or as a being in some other non-human realm of existence.

An alternative term is transmigration, implying migration from one life (body) to another. The term has been used by modern philosophers such as Kurt Gödel and has entered the English language.

Another Greek term sometimes used synonymously is palingenesis, 'being born again'.

Rebirth is a key concept found in major Indian religions, and discussed using various terms. Reincarnation, or Punarjanman ('rebirth, transmigration'), is discussed in the ancient Sanskrit texts of Hinduism, Buddhism, and Jainism, with many alternate terms such as punarāvṛtti, punarājāti, punarjīvātu, punarbhava, āgati-gati (common in Buddhist Pali text), nibbattin, upapatti, and uppajjana.

These religions believe that this reincarnation is cyclic and an endless Saṃsāra, unless one gains spiritual insights that ends this cycle leading to liberation. The reincarnation concept is considered in Indian religions as a step that starts each "cycle of aimless drifting, wandering or mundane existence," but one that is an opportunity to seek spiritual liberation through ethical living and a variety of meditative, yogic (marga), or other spiritual practices. They consider the release from the cycle of reincarnations as the ultimate spiritual goal, and call the liberation by terms such as moksha, nirvana, mukti and kaivalya. However, the Buddhist, Hindu and Jain traditions have differed, since ancient times, in their assumptions and in their details on what reincarnates, how reincarnation occurs and what leads to liberation.

Gilgul, Gilgul neshamot, or Gilgulei Ha Neshamot is the concept of reincarnation in Kabbalistic Judaism, found in much Yiddish literature among Ashkenazi Jews. Gilgul means 'cycle' and neshamot is 'souls'. Kabbalistic reincarnation says that humans reincarnate only to humans unless YHWH/Ein Sof/God chooses.

History

Origins

The origins of the notion of reincarnation are obscure. Discussion of the subject appears in the philosophical traditions of India. The Greek Pre-Socratics discussed reincarnation, and the Celtic druids are also reported to have taught a doctrine of reincarnation.

Early Jainism, Buddhism, and Hinduism

The concepts of the cycle of birth and death, Saṁsāra, and liberation partly derive from ascetic traditions that arose in India around the middle of the first millennium BCE. The first textual references to the idea of reincarnation appear in the Upanishads of the late Vedic period (c. 1100 – c. 500 BCE), predating the Buddha and the Mahavira. Though no direct evidence of this has been found, the tribes of the Ganges valley or the Dravidian traditions of South India have been proposed as another early source of reincarnation beliefs.

The idea of reincarnation, Saṁsāra, did not exist in the early Vedic religions. The early Vedas do not mention the doctrine of Karma and rebirth but mention the belief in an afterlife. It is in the early Upanishads, which are pre-Buddha and pre-Mahavira, where these ideas are developed and described in a general way. Detailed descriptions first appear around the mid-1st millennium BCE in diverse traditions, including Buddhism, Jainism and various schools of Hindu philosophy, each of which gave unique expression to the general principle.

The texts of ancient Jainism that have survived into the modern era are post-Mahavira, likely from the last centuries of the first millennium BCE, and extensively mention rebirth and karma doctrines. The Jaina philosophy assumes that the soul (jiva in Jainism; atman in Hinduism) exists and is eternal, passing through cycles of transmigration and rebirth. After death, reincarnation into a new body is asserted to be instantaneous in early Jaina texts. Depending upon the accumulated karma, rebirth occurs into a higher or lower bodily form, either in heaven or hell or earthly realm. No bodily form is permanent: everyone dies and reincarnates further. Liberation (kevalya) from reincarnation is possible, however, through removing and ending karmic accumulations to one's soul. From the early stages of Jainism on, a human being was considered the highest mortal being, with the potential to achieve liberation, particularly through asceticism.

The early Buddhist texts discuss rebirth as part of the doctrine of Saṃsāra. This asserts that the nature of existence is a "suffering-laden cycle of life, death, and rebirth, without beginning or end."  Also referred to as the wheel of existence (Bhavacakra), it is often mentioned in Buddhist texts with the term punarbhava (rebirth, re-becoming). Liberation from this cycle of existence, Nirvana, is the foundation and the most important purpose of Buddhism. Buddhist texts also assert that an enlightened person knows his previous births, a knowledge achieved through high levels of meditative concentration. Tibetan Buddhism discusses death, bardo (an intermediate state), and rebirth in texts such as the Tibetan Book of the Dead. While Nirvana is taught as the ultimate goal in the Theravadin Buddhism, and is essential to Mahayana Buddhism, the vast majority of contemporary lay Buddhists focus on accumulating good karma and acquiring merit to achieve a better reincarnation in the next life.

In early Buddhist traditions, Saṃsāra cosmology consisted of five realms through which the wheel of existence cycled. This included hells (niraya), hungry ghosts (pretas), animals (tiryak), humans (manushya), and gods (devas, heavenly). In latter Buddhist traditions, this list grew to a list of six realms of rebirth, adding demigods (asuras).

Rationale
The earliest layers of Vedic text incorporate the concept of life, followed by an afterlife in heaven and hell based on cumulative virtues (merit) or vices (demerit). However, the ancient Vedic Rishis challenged this idea of afterlife as simplistic, because people do not live equally moral or immoral lives. Between generally virtuous lives, some are more virtuous; while evil too has degrees, and the texts assert that it would be unfair for people, with varying degrees of virtue or vices, to end up in heaven or hell, in "either or" and disproportionate manner irrespective of how virtuous or vicious their lives were. They introduced the idea of an afterlife in heaven or hell in proportion to one's merit.

Comparison
Early texts of Hinduism, Buddhism and Jainism share the concepts and terminology related to reincarnation. They also emphasize similar virtuous practices and karma as necessary for liberation and what influences future rebirths. For example, all three discuss various virtues—sometimes grouped as Yamas and Niyamas—such as non-violence, truthfulness, non-stealing, non-possessiveness, compassion for all living beings, charity and many others.

Hinduism, Buddhism and Jainism disagree in their assumptions and theories about rebirth. Hinduism relies on its foundational assumption that 'soul, Self exists' (atman or attā), in contrast to Buddhist assumption that there is 'no soul, no Self' (anatta or anatman). Hindu traditions consider soul to be the unchanging eternal essence of a living being, and what journeys across reincarnations until it attains self-knowledge. Buddhism, in contrast, asserts a rebirth theory without a Self, and considers realization of non-Self or Emptiness as Nirvana (nibbana). Thus Buddhism and Hinduism have a very different view on whether a self or soul exists, which impacts the details of their respective rebirth theories.

The reincarnation doctrine in Jainism differs from those in Buddhism, even though both are non-theistic Sramana traditions. Jainism, in contrast to Buddhism, accepts the foundational assumption that soul exists (Jiva) and asserts this soul is involved in the rebirth mechanism. Further, Jainism considers asceticism as an important means to spiritual liberation that ends all reincarnation, while Buddhism does not.

Classical antiquity

Early Greek discussion of the concept dates to the sixth century BCE. An early Greek thinker known to have considered rebirth is Pherecydes of Syros (fl. 540 BCE). His younger contemporary Pythagoras (c. 570–c. 495 BCE), its first famous exponent, instituted societies for its diffusion. Some authorities believe that Pythagoras was Pherecydes' pupil, others that Pythagoras took up the idea of reincarnation from the doctrine of Orphism, a Thracian religion, or brought the teaching from India.

Plato (428/427–348/347 BCE) presented accounts of reincarnation in his works, particularly the Myth of Er, where Plato makes Socrates tell how Er, the son of Armenius, miraculously returned to life on the twelfth day after death and recounted the secrets of the other world. There are myths and theories to the same effect in other dialogues, in the Chariot allegory of the Phaedrus, in the Meno, Timaeus and Laws. The soul, once separated from the body, spends an indeterminate amount of time in the intelligible realm (see The Allegory of the Cave in The Republic) and then assumes another body. In the Timaeus, Plato believes that the soul moves from body to body without any distinct reward-or-punishment phase between lives, because the reincarnation is itself a punishment or reward for how a person has lived.

In Phaedo, Plato has his teacher Socrates, prior to his death, state: "I am confident that there truly is such a thing as living again, and that the living spring from the dead." However, Xenophon does not mention Socrates as believing in reincarnation, and Plato may have systematized Socrates' thought with concepts he took directly from Pythagoreanism or Orphism. Recent scholars have come to see that Plato has multiple reasons for the belief in reincarnation. One argument concerns the theory of reincarnation's usefulness for explaining why non-human animals exist: they are former humans, being punished for their vices; Plato gives this argument at the end of the Timaeus.

Mystery cults
The Orphic religion, which taught reincarnation, about the sixth century BCE, produced a copious literature. Orpheus, its legendary founder, is said to have taught that the immortal soul aspires to freedom while the body holds it prisoner. The wheel of birth revolves, the soul alternates between freedom and captivity round the wide circle of necessity. Orpheus proclaimed the need of the grace of the gods, Dionysus in particular, and of self-purification until the soul has completed the spiral ascent of destiny to live forever.

An association between Pythagorean philosophy and reincarnation was routinely accepted throughout antiquity, as Pythagoras also taught about reincarnation. However, unlike the Orphics, who considered metempsychosis a cycle of grief that could be escaped by attaining liberation from it, Pythagoras seems to postulate an eternal, neutral reincarnation where subsequent lives would not be conditioned by any action done in the previous.

Later authors
In later Greek literature the doctrine is mentioned in a fragment of Menander and satirized by Lucian. In Roman literature it is found as early as Ennius, who, in a lost passage of his Annals, told how he had seen Homer in a dream, who had assured him that the same soul which had animated both the poets had once belonged to a peacock. Persius in his satires (vi. 9) laughs at this; it is referred to also by Lucretius and Horace.

Virgil works the idea into his account of the Underworld in the sixth book of the Aeneid. It persists down to the late classic thinkers, Plotinus and the other Neoplatonists. In the Hermetica, a Graeco-Egyptian series of writings on cosmology and spirituality attributed to Hermes Trismegistus/Thoth, the doctrine of reincarnation is central.

Celtic paganism
In the first century BCE Alexander Cornelius Polyhistor wrote:

Julius Caesar recorded that the druids of Gaul, Britain and Ireland had metempsychosis as one of their core doctrines:

Diodorus also recorded the Gaul belief that human souls were immortal, and that after a prescribed number of years they would commence upon a new life in another body. He added that Gauls had the custom of casting letters to their deceased upon the funeral pyres, through which the dead would be able to read them. Valerius Maximus also recounted they had the custom of lending sums of money to each other which would are repayable in the next world. This was mentioned by Pomponius Mela, who also recorded Gauls buried or burnt with them things they would need in a next life, to the point some would jump into the funeral piles of their relatives in order to cohabite in the new life with them.

Hippolytus of Rome believed the Gauls had been taught the doctrine of reincarnation by a slave of Pythagoras named Zalmoxis. Conversely, Clement of Alexandria believed Pythagoras himself had learned it from the Celts and not the opposite, claiming he had been taught by Galatian Gauls, Hindu priests and Zoroastrians. However, author T. D. Kendrick rejected a real connection between Pythagoras and the Celtic idea reincarnation, noting their beliefs to have substantial differences, and any contact to be historically unlikely. Nonetheless, he proposed the possibility of an ancient common source, also related to the Orphic religion and Thracian systems of belief.

Germanic paganism

Surviving texts indicate that there was a belief in rebirth in Germanic paganism. Examples include figures from eddic poetry and sagas, potentially by way of a process of naming and/or through the family line. Scholars have discussed the implications of these attestations and proposed theories regarding belief in reincarnation among the Germanic peoples prior to Christianization and potentially to some extent in folk belief thereafter.

Judaism
The belief in reincarnation developed among Jewish mystics in the Medieval World, among whom differing explanations were given of the afterlife, although with a universal belief in an immortal soul. It was explicitly rejected by Saadiah Gaon. Today, reincarnation is an esoteric belief within many streams of modern Judaism. Kabbalah teaches a belief in gilgul, transmigration of souls, and hence the belief in reincarnation is universal in Hasidic Judaism, which regards the Kabbalah as sacred and authoritative, and is also sometimes held as an esoteric belief within other strains of Orthodox Judaism. In Judaism, the Zohar, first published in the 13th century, discusses reincarnation at length, especially in the Torah portion "Balak." The most comprehensive kabbalistic work on reincarnation, Shaar HaGilgulim, was written by Chaim Vital, based on the teachings of his mentor, the 16th-century kabbalist Isaac Luria, who was said to know the past lives of each person through his semi-prophetic abilities. The 18th-century Lithuanian master scholar and kabbalist, Elijah of Vilna, known as the Vilna Gaon, authored a commentary on the biblical Book of Jonah as an allegory of reincarnation.

The practice of conversion to Judaism is sometimes understood within Orthodox Judaism in terms of reincarnation. According to this school of thought in Judaism, when non-Jews are drawn to Judaism, it is because they had been Jews in a former life. Such souls may "wander among nations" through multiple lives, until they find their way back to Judaism, including through finding themselves born in a gentile family with a "lost" Jewish ancestor.

There is an extensive literature of Jewish folk and traditional stories that refer to reincarnation.

Christianity

In Greco-Roman thought, the concept of metempsychosis disappeared with the rise of Early Christianity, reincarnation being incompatible with the Christian core doctrine of salvation of the faithful after death. It has been suggested that some of the early Church Fathers, especially Origen, still entertained a belief in the possibility of reincarnation, but evidence is tenuous, and the writings of Origen as they have come down to us speak explicitly against it.

Hebrews 9:27 states that men "die once, but after this the judgement".

Gnosticism
Several Gnostic sects professed reincarnation. The Sethians and followers of Valentinus believed in it. The followers of Bardaisan of Mesopotamia, a sect of the second century deemed heretical by the Catholic Church, drew upon Chaldean astrology, to which Bardaisan's son Harmonius, educated in Athens, added Greek ideas including a sort of metempsychosis. Another such teacher was Basilides (132–? CE/AD), known to us through the criticisms of Irenaeus and the work of Clement of Alexandria (see also Neoplatonism and Gnosticism and Buddhism and Gnosticism).

In the third Christian century Manichaeism spread both east and west from Babylonia, then within the Sassanid Empire, where its founder Mani lived about 216–276. Manichaean monasteries existed in Rome in 312 AD. Noting Mani's early travels to the Kushan Empire and other Buddhist influences in Manichaeism, Richard Foltz attributes Mani's teaching of reincarnation to Buddhist influence. However the inter-relation of Manicheanism, Orphism, Gnosticism and neo-Platonism is far from clear.

Taoism
Taoist documents from as early as the Han Dynasty claimed that Lao Tzu appeared on earth as different persons in different times beginning in the legendary era of Three Sovereigns and Five Emperors. The (ca. third century BC) Chuang Tzu states: "Birth is not a beginning; death is not an end. There is existence without limitation; there is continuity without a starting-point. Existence without limitation is Space. Continuity without a starting point is Time. There is birth, there is death, there is issuing forth, there is entering in."

European Middle Ages
Around the 11–12th century in Europe, several reincarnationist movements were persecuted as heresies, through the establishment of the Inquisition in the Latin west. These included the Cathar, Paterene or Albigensian church of western Europe, the Paulician movement, which arose in Armenia, and the Bogomils in Bulgaria.

Christian sects such as the Bogomils and the Cathars, who professed reincarnation and other gnostic beliefs, were referred to as "Manichaean", and are today sometimes described by scholars as "Neo-Manichaean". As there is no known Manichaean mythology or terminology in the writings of these groups there has been some dispute among historians as to whether these groups truly were descendants of Manichaeism.

Renaissance and Early Modern period
While reincarnation has been a matter of faith in some communities from an early date it has also frequently been argued for on principle, as Plato does when he argues that the number of souls must be finite because souls are indestructible, Benjamin Franklin held a similar view. Sometimes such convictions, as in Socrates' case, arise from a more general personal faith, at other times from anecdotal evidence such as Plato makes Socrates offer in the Myth of Er.

During the Renaissance translations of Plato, the Hermetica and other works fostered new European interest in reincarnation. Marsilio Ficino argued that Plato's references to reincarnation were intended allegorically, Shakespeare alluded to the doctrine of reincarnation but Giordano Bruno was burned at the stake by authorities after being found guilty of heresy by the Roman Inquisition for his teachings. But the Greek philosophical works remained available and, particularly in north Europe, were discussed by groups such as the Cambridge Platonists. Emanuel Swedenborg believed that we leave the physical world once, but then go through several lives in the spiritual world—a kind of hybrid of Christian tradition and the popular view of reincarnation.

19th to 20th centuries

By the 19th century the philosophers Schopenhauer and Nietzsche could access the Indian scriptures for discussion of the doctrine of reincarnation, which recommended itself to the American Transcendentalists Henry David Thoreau, Walt Whitman and Ralph Waldo Emerson and was adapted by Francis Bowen into Christian Metempsychosis.

By the early 20th century, interest in reincarnation had been introduced into the nascent discipline of psychology, largely due to the influence of William James, who raised aspects of the philosophy of mind, comparative religion, the psychology of religious experience and the nature of empiricism. James was influential in the founding of the American Society for Psychical Research (ASPR) in New York City in 1885, three years after the British Society for Psychical Research (SPR) was inaugurated in London, leading to systematic, critical investigation of paranormal phenomena.  Famous World War II American General George Patton was a strong believer in reincarnation, believing, among other things, he was a reincarnation of the Carthaginian General Hannibal.

At this time popular awareness of the idea of reincarnation was boosted by the Theosophical Society's dissemination of systematised and universalised Indian concepts and also by the influence of magical societies like The Golden Dawn. Notable personalities like Annie Besant, W. B. Yeats and Dion Fortune made the subject almost as familiar an element of the popular culture of the west as of the east. By 1924 the subject could be satirised in popular children's books. Humorist Don Marquis created a fictional cat named Mehitabel who claimed to be a reincarnation of Queen Cleopatra.

Théodore Flournoy was among the first to study a claim of past-life recall in the course of his investigation of the medium Hélène Smith, published in 1900, in which he defined the possibility of cryptomnesia in such accounts.
Carl Gustav Jung, like Flournoy based in Switzerland, also emulated him in his thesis based on a study of cryptomnesia in psychism. Later Jung would emphasise the importance of the persistence of memory and ego in psychological study of reincarnation: "This concept of rebirth necessarily implies the continuity of personality... (that) one is able, at least potentially, to remember that one has lived through previous existences, and that these existences were one's own...." Hypnosis, used in psychoanalysis for retrieving forgotten memories, was eventually tried as a means of studying the phenomenon of past life recall.

More recently, many people in the West have developed an interest in and acceptance of reincarnation. Many new religious movements include reincarnation among their beliefs, e.g. modern Neopagans, Spiritism, Astara, Dianetics, and Scientology. Many esoteric philosophies also include reincarnation, e.g. Theosophy, Anthroposophy, Kabbalah, and Gnostic and Esoteric Christianity such as the works of Martinus Thomsen.

Demographic survey data from 1999 to 2002 shows a significant minority of people from Europe (22%) and America (20%) believe in the existence of life before birth and after death, leading to a physical rebirth.  The belief in reincarnation is particularly high in the Baltic countries, with Lithuania having the highest figure for the whole of Europe, 44%, while the lowest figure is in East Germany, 12%. A quarter of U.S. Christians, including 10% of all born again Christians, embrace the idea.

Academic psychiatrist and believer in reincarnation, Ian Stevenson, reported that belief in reincarnation is held (with variations in details) by adherents of almost all major religions except Christianity and Islam. In addition, between 20 and 30 percent of persons in western countries who may be nominal Christians also believe in reincarnation. One 1999 study by Walter and Waterhouse reviewed the previous data on the level of reincarnation belief and performed a set of thirty in-depth interviews in Britain among people who did not belong to a religion advocating reincarnation. The authors reported that surveys have found about one fifth to one quarter of Europeans have some level of belief in reincarnation, with similar results found in the USA. In the interviewed group, the belief in the existence of this phenomenon appeared independent of their age, or the type of religion that these people belonged to, with most being Christians. The beliefs of this group also did not appear to contain any more than usual of "new age" ideas (broadly defined) and the authors interpreted their ideas on reincarnation as "one way of tackling issues of suffering", but noted that this seemed to have little effect on their private lives.

Waterhouse also published a detailed discussion of beliefs expressed in the interviews. She noted that although most people "hold their belief in reincarnation quite lightly" and were unclear on the details of their ideas, personal experiences such as past-life memories and near-death experiences had influenced most believers, although only a few had direct experience of these phenomena. Waterhouse analyzed the influences of second-hand accounts of reincarnation, writing that most of the people in the survey had heard other people's accounts of past-lives from regression hypnosis and dreams and found these fascinating, feeling that there "must be something in it" if other people were having such experiences.

Other influential contemporary figures that have written on reincarnation include Alice Ann Bailey, one of the first writers to use the terms New Age and age of Aquarius, Torkom Saraydarian, an Armenian-American musician and religious author, Dolores Cannon, Atul Gawande, Michael Newton, Bruce Greyson, Raymond Moody and Unity Church founder Charles Fillmore. Neale Donald Walsch, an American author of the series Conversations with God  claims that he has reincarnated more than 600 times. The Indian spiritual teacher Meher Baba who had significant following in the West taught that reincarnation followed from human desire and ceased once a person was freed from desire.

Religions and philosophies

Buddhism

According to various Buddhist scriptures, Gautama Buddha believed in the existence of an afterlife in another world and in reincarnation,

The Buddha also asserted that karma influences rebirth, and that the cycles of repeated births and deaths are endless. Before the birth of Buddha, ancient Indian scholars had developed competing theories of afterlife, including the materialistic school such as Charvaka, which posited that death is the end, there is no afterlife, no soul, no rebirth, no karma, and they described death to be a state where a living being is completely annihilated, dissolved. Buddha rejected this theory, adopted the alternate existing theories on rebirth, criticizing the materialistic schools that denied rebirth and karma, states Damien Keown. Such beliefs are inappropriate and dangerous, stated Buddha, because such annihilationism views encourage moral irresponsibility and material hedonism; he tied moral responsibility to rebirth.

The Buddha introduced the concept that there is no permanent self (soul), and this central concept in Buddhism is called anattā. Major contemporary Buddhist traditions such as Theravada, Mahayana and Vajrayana traditions accept the teachings of Buddha. These teachings assert there is rebirth, there is no permanent self and no irreducible ātman (soul) moving from life to another and tying these lives together, there is impermanence, that all compounded things such as living beings are aggregates dissolve at death, but every being reincarnates. The rebirth cycles continue endlessly, states Buddhism, and it is a source of duhkha (suffering, pain), but this reincarnation and duhkha cycle can be stopped through nirvana. The anattā doctrine of Buddhism is a contrast to Hinduism, the latter asserting that "soul exists, it is involved in rebirth, and it is through this soul that everything is connected."

Different traditions within Buddhism have offered different theories on what reincarnates and how reincarnation happens. One theory suggests that it occurs through consciousness (Sanskrit: vijñāna; Pali: samvattanika-viññana) or stream of consciousness (Sanskrit: citta-santāna, vijñāna-srotām, or vijñāna-santāna; Pali: viññana-sotam) upon death, which reincarnates into a new aggregation. This process, states this theory, is similar to the flame of a dying candle lighting up another. The consciousness in the newly born being is neither identical to nor entirely different from that in the deceased but the two form a causal continuum or stream in this Buddhist theory. Transmigration is influenced by a being's past karma (Pali: kamma). The root cause of rebirth, states Buddhism, is the abiding of consciousness in ignorance (Sanskrit: avidya; Pali: avijja) about the nature of reality, and when this ignorance is uprooted, rebirth ceases.

Buddhist traditions also vary in their mechanistic details on rebirth. Most Theravada Buddhists assert that rebirth is immediate while the Tibetan and most Chinese and Japanese schools hold to the notion of a bardo (intermediate state) that can last up to 49 days. The bardo rebirth concept of Tibetan Buddhism, originally developed in India but spread to Tibet and other Buddhist countries,  and involves 42 peaceful deities, and 58 wrathful deities. These ideas led to maps on karma and what form of rebirth one takes after death, discussed in texts such as The Tibetan Book of the Dead. The major Buddhist traditions accept that the reincarnation of a being depends on the past karma and merit (demerit) accumulated, and that there are six realms of existence in which the rebirth may occur after each death.

Within Japanese Zen, reincarnation is accepted by some, but rejected by others. A distinction can be drawn between 'folk Zen', as in the Zen practiced by devotional lay people, and 'philosophical Zen'. Folk Zen generally accepts the various supernatural elements of Buddhism such as rebirth. Philosophical Zen, however, places more emphasis on the present moment.

Some schools conclude that karma continues to exist and adhere to the person until it works out its consequences. For the Sautrantika school, each act "perfumes" the individual or "plants a seed" that later germinates. Tibetan Buddhism stresses the state of mind at the time of death. To die with a peaceful mind will stimulate a virtuous seed and a fortunate rebirth; a disturbed mind will stimulate a non-virtuous seed and an unfortunate rebirth.

Christianity
In the major Christian denominations, the concept of reincarnation is not present and it is nowhere explicitly referred to in the Bible. However, the impossibility of a second earthly death is stated by 1 Peter 3:18-20, where it affirms that the messiah, Jesus of Nazareth, died once forever for the sins of all the human kind. Matthew 14:1-2 mentions that king Herod Antipas took Jesus to be a risen John the Baptist, when introducing the story of John's execution at Herod's orders.

In a survey by the Pew Forum in 2009, 22% of American Christians expressed a belief in reincarnation, and in a 1981 survey 31% of regular churchgoing European Catholics expressed a belief in reincarnation.

Some Christian theologians interpret certain Biblical passages as referring to reincarnation. These passages include the questioning of Jesus as to whether he is Elijah, John the Baptist, Jeremiah, or another prophet (Matthew 16:13–15 and John 1:21–22) and, less clearly (while Elijah was said not to have died, but to have been taken up to heaven), John the Baptist being asked if he is not Elijah (John 1:25). Geddes MacGregor, an Episcopalian priest and professor of philosophy, has made a case for the compatibility of Christian doctrine and reincarnation.

Early
There is evidence that Origen, a Church father in early Christian times, taught reincarnation in his lifetime but that when his works were translated into Latin these references were concealed. One of the epistles written by St. Jerome, "To Avitus" (Letter 124; Ad Avitum. Epistula CXXIV), which asserts that Origen's On the First Principles (Latin: De Principiis; Greek: Περὶ Ἀρχῶν) was mistranscribed:

Under the impression that Origen was a heretic like Arius, St. Jerome criticizes ideas described in On the First Principles. Further in "To Avitus" (Letter 124), St. Jerome writes about "convincing proof" that Origen teaches reincarnation in the original version of the book:

The original text of On First Principles has almost completely disappeared. It remains extant as De Principiis in fragments faithfully translated into Latin by St. Jerome and in "the not very reliable Latin translation of Rufinus."

Belief in reincarnation was rejected by Augustine of Hippo in The City of God.

Druze

Reincarnation is a paramount tenet in the Druze faith. There is an eternal duality of the body and the soul and it is impossible for the soul to exist without the body. Therefore, reincarnations occur instantly at one's death. While in the Hindu and Buddhist belief system a soul can be transmitted to any living creature, in the Druze belief system this is not possible and a human soul will only transfer to a human body. Furthermore, souls cannot be divided into different or separate parts and the number of souls existing is finite.

Few Druzes are able to recall their past but, if they are able to they are called a Nateq. Typically souls who have died violent deaths in their previous incarnation will be able to recall memories. Since death is seen as a quick transient state, mourning is discouraged. Unlike other Abrahamic faiths, heaven and hell are spiritual. Heaven is the ultimate happiness received when soul escapes the cycle of rebirths and reunites with the Creator, while hell is conceptualized as the bitterness of being unable to reunite with the Creator and escape from the cycle of rebirth.

Hinduism

The body dies, assert the Hindu traditions, but not the soul, which they assume to be the eternal reality, indestructible and bliss. Everything and all existence is believed to be connected and cyclical in many Hinduism-sects, all living beings composed of two things, the soul and the body or matter. Ātman does not change and cannot change by its innate nature in the Hindu belief. Current Karma impacts the future circumstances in this life, as well as the future forms and realms of lives. Good intent and actions lead to good future, bad intent and actions lead to bad future, impacting how one reincarnates, in the Hindu view of existence.

There is no permanent heaven or hell in most Hinduism-sects. In the afterlife, based on one's karma, the soul is reborn as another being in heaven, hell, or a living being on earth (human, animal). Gods, too, die once their past karmic merit runs out, as do those in hell, and they return getting another chance on earth. This reincarnation continues, endlessly in cycles, until one embarks on a spiritual pursuit, realizes self-knowledge, and thereby gains mokṣa, the final release out of the reincarnation cycles. This release is believed to be a state of utter bliss, which Hindu traditions believe is either related or identical to Brahman, the unchanging reality that existed before the creation of universe, continues to exist, and shall exist after the universe ends.

The Upanishads, part of the scriptures of the Hindu traditions, primarily focus on the liberation from reincarnation. The Bhagavad Gita discusses various paths to liberation. The Upanishads, states Harold Coward, offer a "very optimistic view regarding the perfectibility of human nature," and the goal of human effort in these texts is a continuous journey to self-perfection and self-knowledge so as to end Saṃsāra—the endless cycle of rebirth and redeath. The aim of spiritual quest in the Upanishadic traditions is find the true self within and to know one's soul, a state that they assert leads to blissful state of freedom, moksha.

The Bhagavad Gita states:

There are internal differences within Hindu traditions on reincarnation and the state of moksha. For example, the dualistic devotional traditions such as Madhvacharya's Dvaita Vedanta tradition of Hinduism champion a theistic premise, assert that human soul and Brahman are different, loving devotion to Brahman (god Vishnu in Madhvacharya's theology) is the means to release from Samsara, it is the grace of God which leads to moksha, and spiritual liberation is achievable only in after-life (videhamukti). The non-dualistic traditions such as Adi Shankara's Advaita Vedanta tradition of Hinduism champion a monistic premise, asserting that the individual human soul and Brahman are identical, only ignorance, impulsiveness and inertia leads to suffering through Saṃsāra, in reality there are no dualities, meditation and self-knowledge is the path to liberation, the realization that one's soul is identical to Brahman is moksha, and spiritual liberation is achievable in this life (jivanmukti).

Islam
Most Islamic schools of thought reject any idea of reincarnation of living beings. It teaches a linear concept of life, wherein a human being has only one life and upon death he or she is judged by God, then rewarded in heaven or punished in hell. Islam teaches final resurrection and Judgement Day, but there is no prospect for the reincarnation of a human being into a different body or being. During the early history of Islam, some of the Caliphs persecuted all reincarnation-believing people, such as Manichaeism, to the point of extinction in Mesopotamia and Persia (modern day Iraq and Iran). However, some Muslim minority sects such as those found among Sufis, and some Muslims in South Asia and Indonesia have retained their pre-Islamic Hindu and Buddhist beliefs in reincarnation. For instance, historically, South Asian Isma'ilis performed chantas yearly, one of which is for seeking forgiveness of sins committed in past lives. However Inayat Khan has criticized the idea as unhelpful to the spiritual seeker.

From the teachings of Modern Sufi Sheikh M.R. Bawa Muhaiyadeen (Guru Bawa); a person's state continuously changes during his one lifetime (angry/violent at once and being gentle/nice in another). So when a person's state changes, his previous state dies. Even though it dies, the earlier state (of anger) will be reborn in another minute. According to Guru Bawa; the changing of a person's state is described as “rebirth” or reincarnation, this should not be confused with the physical death & rebirth. Although some scholars wrongly misquote that Guru Bawa accepts the common belief of reincarnation. For Guru Bawa, the reincarnation is spiritual, perhaps in kind, and with each rebirth a stage of consciousness is removed. The first birth consist of six consciousness and with each rebirth, a stage is removed until one is born with single stage of consciousness, such as a tree, shrub or a flower if he at least hold good principals in last stage of consciousness. If not, he will be born as a worm or something similar.

Ghulat sects
The idea of reincarnation is accepted by a few non-Sunni Muslim sects, particularly of the Ghulat. Alawites hold that they were originally stars or divine lights that were cast out of heaven through disobedience and must undergo repeated reincarnation (or metempsychosis) before returning to heaven. They can be reincarnated as Christians or others through sin and as animals if they become infidels.

Jainism

In Jainism, the reincarnation doctrine, along with its theories of Saṃsāra and Karma, are central to its theological foundations, as evidenced by the extensive literature on it in the major sects of Jainism, and their pioneering ideas on these topics from the earliest times of the Jaina tradition. Reincarnation in contemporary Jainism traditions is the belief that the worldly life is characterized by continuous rebirths and suffering in various realms of existence.

Karma forms a central and fundamental part of Jain faith, being intricately connected to other of its philosophical concepts like transmigration, reincarnation, liberation, non-violence (ahiṃsā) and non-attachment, among others. Actions are seen to have consequences: some immediate, some delayed, even into future incarnations. So the doctrine of karma is not considered simply in relation to one life-time, but also in relation to both future incarnations and past lives. Uttarādhyayana Sūtra 3.3–4 states: "The jīva or the soul is sometimes born in the world of gods, sometimes in hell. Sometimes it acquires the body of a demon; all this happens on account of its karma. This jīva sometimes takes birth as a worm, as an insect or as an ant." The text further states (32.7): "Karma is the root of birth and death. The souls bound by karma go round and round in the cycle of existence."

Actions and emotions in the current lifetime affect future incarnations depending on the nature of the particular karma. For example, a good and virtuous life indicates a latent desire to experience good and virtuous themes of life. Therefore, such a person attracts karma that ensures that their future births will allow them to experience and manifest their virtues and good feelings unhindered. In this case, they may take birth in heaven or in a prosperous and virtuous human family. On the other hand, a person who has indulged in immoral deeds, or with a cruel disposition, indicates a latent desire to experience cruel themes of life. As a natural consequence, they will attract karma which will ensure that they are reincarnated in hell, or in lower life forms, to enable their soul to experience the cruel themes of life.

There is no retribution, judgment or reward involved but a natural consequences of the choices in life made either knowingly or unknowingly. Hence, whatever suffering or pleasure that a soul may be experiencing in its present life is on account of choices that it has made in the past. As a result of this doctrine, Jainism attributes supreme importance to pure thinking and moral behavior.

The Jain texts postulate four gatis, that is states-of-existence or birth-categories, within which the soul transmigrates. The four gatis are: deva (demigods), manuṣya (humans), nāraki (hell beings), and tiryañca (animals, plants, and microorganisms). The four gatis have four corresponding realms or habitation levels in the vertically tiered Jain universe: deva occupy the higher levels where the heavens are situated; manuṣya and tiryañca occupy the middle levels; and nāraki occupy the lower levels where seven hells are situated.

Single-sensed souls, however, called nigoda, and element-bodied souls pervade all tiers of this universe. Nigodas are souls at the bottom end of the existential hierarchy. They are so tiny and undifferentiated, that they lack even individual bodies, living in colonies. According to Jain texts, this infinity of nigodas can also be found in plant tissues, root vegetables and animal bodies. Depending on its karma, a soul transmigrates and reincarnates within the scope of this cosmology of destinies. The four main destinies are further divided into sub-categories and still smaller sub-sub-categories. In all, Jain texts speak of a cycle of 8.4 million birth destinies in which souls find themselves again and again as they cycle within samsara.

In Jainism, God has no role to play in an individual's destiny; one's personal destiny is not seen as a consequence of any system of reward or punishment, but rather as a result of its own personal karma. A text from a volume of the ancient Jain canon, Bhagvati sūtra 8.9.9, links specific states of existence to specific karmas. Violent deeds, killing of creatures having five sense organs, eating fish, and so on, lead to rebirth in hell. Deception, fraud and falsehood lead to rebirth in the animal and vegetable world. Kindness, compassion and humble character result in human birth; while austerities and the making and keeping of vows lead to rebirth in heaven.

Each soul is thus responsible for its own predicament, as well as its own salvation. Accumulated karma represent a sum total of all unfulfilled desires, attachments and aspirations of a soul. It enables the soul to experience the various themes of the lives that it desires to experience. Hence a soul may transmigrate from one life form to another for countless of years, taking with it the karma that it has earned, until it finds conditions that bring about the required fruits. In certain philosophies, heavens and hells are often viewed as places for eternal salvation or eternal damnation for good and bad deeds. But according to Jainism, such places, including the earth are simply the places which allow the soul to experience its unfulfilled karma.

Judaism

Jewish mystical texts (the Kabbalah), from their classic Medieval canon onward, teach a belief in Gilgul Neshamot (Hebrew for metempsychosis; literally 'soul cycle'; plural gilgulim). The Zohar and the Sefer HaBahir specifically discuss reincarnation. It is a common belief in contemporary Hasidic Judaism, which regards the Kabbalah as sacred and authoritative, though understood in light of a more innate psychological mysticism. Kabbalah also teaches that "The soul of Moses is reincarnated in every generation." Other, Non-Hasidic, Orthodox Jewish groups while not placing a heavy emphasis on reincarnation, do acknowledge it as a valid teaching. Its popularization entered modern secular Yiddish literature and folk motif.

The 16th century mystical renaissance in communal Safed replaced scholastic Rationalism as mainstream traditional Jewish theology, both in scholarly circles and in the popular imagination. References to gilgul in former Kabbalah became systematized as part of the metaphysical purpose of creation. Isaac Luria (the Ari) brought the issue to the centre of his new mystical articulation, for the first time, and advocated identification of the reincarnations of historic Jewish figures that were compiled by Haim Vital in his Shaar HaGilgulim. Gilgul is contrasted with the other processes in Kabbalah of Ibbur ('pregnancy'), the attachment of a second soul to an individual for (or by) good means, and Dybuk ('possession'), the attachment of a spirit, demon, etc. to an individual for (or by) "bad" means.

In Lurianic Kabbalah, reincarnation is not retributive or fatalistic, but an expression of Divine compassion, the microcosm of the doctrine of cosmic rectification of creation. Gilgul is a heavenly agreement with the individual soul, conditional upon circumstances. Luria's radical system focused on rectification of the Divine soul, played out through Creation. The true essence of anything is the divine spark within that gives it existence. Even a stone or leaf possesses such a soul that "came into this world to receive a rectification." A human soul may occasionally be exiled into lower inanimate, vegetative or animal creations. The most basic component of the soul, the nefesh, must leave at the cessation of blood production. There are four other soul components and different nations of the world possess different forms of souls with different purposes. Each Jewish soul is reincarnated in order to fulfill each of the 613 Mosaic commandments that elevate a particular spark of holiness associated with each commandment. Once all the Sparks are redeemed to their spiritual source, the Messianic Era begins. Non-Jewish observance of the 7 Laws of Noah assists the Jewish people, though Biblical adversaries of Israel reincarnate to oppose.

Among the many rabbis who accepted reincarnation are Nahmanides (the Ramban) and Rabbenu Bahya ben Asher, Levi ibn Habib (the Ralbah), Shelomoh Alkabez, Moses Cordovero, Moses Chaim Luzzatto; early Hasidic masters such as the Baal Shem Tov, Schneur Zalman of Liadi and Nachman of Breslov, as well as virtually all later Hasidic masters;  contemporary Hasidic teachers such as DovBer Pinson, Moshe Weinberger and Joel Landau; and key Mitnagdic leaders, such as the Vilna Gaon and Chaim Volozhin and their school, as well as Rabbi Shalom Sharabi (known at the RaShaSH), the Ben Ish Chai of Baghdad, and the Baba Sali. Rabbis who have rejected the idea include Saadia Gaon, David Kimhi, Hasdai Crescas, Joseph Albo, Abraham ibn Daud, Leon de Modena, Solomon ben Aderet, Maimonides and Asher ben Jehiel. Among the Geonim, Hai Gaon argued in favour of gilgulim.

Ho-Chunk
Reincarnation is an intrinsic part of some northern Native American and Inuit traditions. In the now heavily Christian Polar North (now mainly parts of Greenland and Nunavut), the concept of reincarnation is enshrined in the Inuit language.

The following is a story of human-to-human reincarnation as told by Thunder Cloud, a Winnebago (Ho-Chunk tribe) shaman referred to as T. C. in the narrative. Here T. C. talks about his two previous lives and how he died and came back again to this his third lifetime. He describes his time between lives, when he was “blessed” by Earth Maker and all the abiding spirits and given special powers, including the ability to heal the sick.

T. C.'s Account of his two reincarnations:

Sikhism
Founded in the 15th century, Sikhism's founder Guru Nanak had a choice between the cyclical reincarnation concept of ancient Indian religions and the linear concept of Islam, he chose the cyclical concept of time. Sikhism teaches reincarnation theory similar to those in Hinduism, but with some differences from its traditional doctrines. Sikh rebirth theories about the nature of existence are similar to ideas that developed during the devotional Bhakti movement particularly within some Vaishnava traditions, which define liberation as a state of union with God attained through the grace of God.

The doctrines of Sikhism teach that the soul exists, and is passed from one body to another in endless cycles of Saṃsāra, until liberation from the death and rebirth cycle. Each birth begins with karma (karam), and these actions leave a karmic signature (karni) on one's soul which influences future rebirths, but it is God whose grace that liberates from the death and rebirth cycle. The way out of the reincarnation cycle, asserts Sikhism, is to live an ethical life, devote oneself to God and constantly remember God's name. The precepts of Sikhism encourage the bhakti of One Lord for mukti (liberation from the death and rebirth cycle).

New religious and spiritual movements

Spiritism

Spiritism, a Christian philosophy codified in the 19th century by the French educator Allan Kardec, teaches reincarnation or rebirth into human life after death. According to this doctrine, free will and cause and effect are the corollaries of reincarnation, and reincarnation provides a mechanism for a person's spiritual evolution in successive lives.

Theosophy

The Theosophical Society draws much of its inspiration from India. In the Theosophical world-view reincarnation is the vast rhythmic process by which the soul, the part of a person which belongs to the formless non-material and timeless worlds, unfolds its spiritual powers in the world and comes to know itself. It descends from sublime, free, spiritual realms and gathers experience through its effort to express itself in the world. Afterwards there is a withdrawal from the physical plane to successively higher levels of reality, in death, a purification and assimilation of the past life. Having cast off all instruments of personal experience it stands again in its spiritual and formless nature, ready to begin its next rhythmic manifestation, every lifetime bringing it closer to complete self-knowledge and self-expression. However it may attract old mental, emotional, and energetic karma patterns to form the new personality.

Anthroposophy
Anthroposophy describes reincarnation from the point of view of Western philosophy and culture. The ego is believed to transmute transient soul experiences into universals that form the basis for an individuality that can endure after death. These universals include ideas, which are intersubjective and thus transcend the purely personal (spiritual consciousness), intentionally formed human character (spiritual life), and becoming a fully conscious human being (spiritual humanity). Rudolf Steiner described both the general principles he believed to be operative in reincarnation, such as that one's will activity in one life forms the basis for the thinking of the next, and a number of successive lives of various individualities.

Modern astrology
Inspired by Helena Blavatsky's major works, including Isis Unveiled and The Secret Doctrine, astrologers in the early twentieth-century integrated the concepts of karma and reincarnation into the practice of Western astrology. Notable astrologers who advanced this development included Alan Leo, Charles E. O. Carter, Marc Edmund Jones, and Dane Rudhyar. A new synthesis of East and West resulted as Hindu and Buddhist concepts of reincarnation were fused with Western astrology's deep roots in Hermeticism and Neoplatonism. In the case of Rudhyar, this synthesis was enhanced with the addition of Jungian depth psychology. This dynamic integration of astrology, reincarnation and depth psychology has continued into the modern era with the work of astrologers Steven Forrest and Jeffrey Wolf Green.  Their respective schools of Evolutionary Astrology are based on "an acceptance of the fact that human beings incarnate in a succession of lifetimes."

Scientology

Past reincarnation, usually termed past lives, is a key part of the principles and practices of the Church of Scientology. Scientologists believe that the human individual is actually a thetan, an immortal spiritual entity, that has fallen into a degraded state as a result of past-life experiences. Scientology auditing is intended to free the person of these past-life traumas and recover past-life memory, leading to a higher state of spiritual awareness.

This idea is echoed in their highest fraternal religious order, Sea Org, whose motto is "Revenimus" ('We Come Back'), and whose members sign a "billion-year contract" as a sign of commitment to that ideal. L. Ron Hubbard, the founder of Scientology, does not use the word "reincarnation" to describe its beliefs, noting that: "The common definition of reincarnation has been altered from its original meaning. The word has come to mean 'to be born again in different life forms' whereas its actual definition is 'to be born again into the flesh of another body.' Scientology ascribes to this latter, original definition of reincarnation."

The first writings in Scientology regarding past lives date from around 1951 and slightly earlier. In 1960, Hubbard published a book on past lives entitled Have You Lived Before This Life. In 1968 he wrote Mission into Time, a report on a five-week sailing expedition to Sardinia, Sicily and Carthage to see if specific evidence could be found to substantiate L. Ron Hubbard's recall of incidents in his own past, centuries ago.

Wicca
Wicca is a neo-pagan religion focused on nature, guided by the philosophy of Wiccan Rede that advocates the tenets "Harm None, Do As Ye Will". Wiccans believe in a form of karmic return where one's deeds are returned, either in the current life or in another life, threefold or multiple times in order to teach one lessons (the Threefold Law). Reincarnation is therefore an accepted part of the Wiccan faith. Wiccans also believe that death and afterlife are important experiences for the soul to transform and prepare for future lifetimes.

Reincarnation and science 

While there has been no scientific confirmation of the physical reality of reincarnation, where the subject has been discussed, there are questions of whether and how such beliefs may be justified within the discourse of science and religion. Some champions of academic parapsychology have argued that they have scientific evidence even while their detractors have accused them of practicing a form of pseudoscience. Skeptic Carl Sagan asked the Dalai Lama what he would do if a fundamental tenet of his religion (reincarnation) were definitively disproved by science. The Dalai Lama answered, "If science can disprove reincarnation, Tibetan Buddhism would abandon reincarnation…but it's going to be mighty hard to disprove reincarnation." Sagan considered claims of memories of past lives to be worthy of research, although he considered reincarnation to be an unlikely explanation for these.

Claims of past lives

Over a period of 40 years, psychiatrist Ian Stevenson, from the University of Virginia, recorded case studies of young children who claimed to remember past lives. He published twelve books, including Twenty Cases Suggestive of Reincarnation, Reincarnation and Biology: A Contribution to the Etiology of Birthmarks and Birth Defects (a two-part monograph), European Cases of the Reincarnation Type, and Where Reincarnation and Biology Intersect. In his cases he reported the child's statements and testimony from family members and others, often along with what he considered to be correlates to a deceased person who in some ways seemed to match the child's memory. Stevenson also investigated cases where he thought that birthmarks and birth defects seemed to match wounds and scars on the deceased. Sometimes included in his documentation were medical records like autopsy photographs. As any claim of past life memory is subject to charges of false memories and the ease with which such claims can be hoaxed, Stevenson expected the controversy and skepticism of his beliefs that followed. He said that he looked for disconfirming evidence and alternative explanations for reports, but, as the Washington Post reported, he typically concluded that no normal explanation sufficed.

Other academic researchers who have undertaken similar pursuits include Jim B. Tucker, Antonia Mills, Satwant Pasricha, Godwin Samararatne, and Erlendur Haraldsson, but Stevenson's publications remain the most well known. Stevenson's work in this regard was impressive enough to Carl Sagan that he referred to what were apparently Stevenson's investigations in his book The Demon-Haunted World as an example of carefully collected empirical data, and though he rejected reincarnation as a parsimonious explanation for the stories, he wrote that the phenomenon of alleged past-life memories should be further researched. Sam Harris cited Stevenson's works in his book The End of Faith as part of a body of data that seems to attest to the reality of psychic phenomena, but that only relies on subjective personal experience. 

Stevenson's claims have been subject to criticism and debunking, for example by the philosopher Paul Edwards, who contended that Ian Stevenson's accounts of reincarnation were purely anecdotal and cherry-picked. Edwards attributed the stories to selective thinking, suggestion, and false memories that result from the family's or researcher's belief systems and thus did not rise to the standard of fairly sampled empirical evidence. The philosopher Keith Augustine wrote in critique that the fact that "the vast majority of Stevenson's cases come from countries where a religious belief in reincarnation is strong, and rarely elsewhere, seems to indicate that cultural conditioning (rather than reincarnation) generates claims of spontaneous past-life memories." Further, Ian Wilson pointed out that a large number of Stevenson's cases consisted of poor children remembering wealthy lives or belonging to a higher caste. In these societies, claims of reincarnation have been used as schemes to obtain money from the richer families of alleged former incarnations. Robert Baker asserted that all the past-life experiences investigated by Stevenson and other parapsychologists are understandable in terms of known psychological factors including a mixture of cryptomnesia and confabulation. Edwards also objected that reincarnation invokes assumptions that are inconsistent with modern science. As the vast majority of people do not remember previous lives and there is no empirically documented mechanism known that allows personality to survive death and travel to another body, positing the existence of reincarnation is subject to the principle that "extraordinary claims require extraordinary evidence". Researchers such as Stevenson acknowledged these limitations.

Stevenson also claimed there were a handful of cases that suggested evidence of xenoglossy, including two where a subject under hypnosis allegedly conversed with people speaking the foreign language, instead of merely being able to recite foreign words. Sarah Thomason, a linguist (and skeptical researcher) at the University of Michigan, reanalyzed these cases, concluding that "the linguistic evidence is too weak to provide support for the claims of xenoglossy."

Past life regression

Some believers in reincarnation (Stevenson famously not among them) give much importance to supposed past-life memories retrieved under hypnosis during past life regressions. Popularized by psychiatrist Brian Weiss who claims he has regressed more than 4,000 patients since 1980, the technique is often identified as a kind of pseudoscientific practice. Such supposed memories have been documented to contain historical inaccuracies originating from modern popular culture, common beliefs about history, or books that discuss historical events. Experiments with subjects undergoing past life regression indicate that a belief in reincarnation and suggestions by the hypnotist are the two most important factors regarding the contents of memories reported. The use of hypnosis and suggestive questions can tend to leave the subject particularly likely to hold distorted or false memories. Rather than recall of a previous existence, the source of the memories is more likely cryptomnesia and confabulations that combine experiences, knowledge, imagination and suggestion or guidance from the hypnotist.  Once created, those memories are indistinguishable from memories based on events that occurred during the subject's life.

Past-life regression has been critiqued for being unethical on the grounds that it lacks any evidence to support its claims and that it increases one's susceptibility to false memories. Luis Cordón states that this can be problematic as it creates delusions under the guise of therapy. The memories are experienced as being as vivid as those based on events experienced in one's life and impossible to differentiate from true memories of actual events, and accordingly any damage can be difficult to undo.

APA accredited organizations have challenged the use of past-life regressions as a therapeutic method, calling it unethical. Additionally, the hypnotic methodology that underpins past-life regression has been criticized as placing the participant in a vulnerable position, susceptible to implantation of false memories. Because the implantation of false memories may be harmful, Gabriel Andrade argues that past-life regression violates the principle of first, do no harm (non-maleficence), part of the Hippocratic Oath.

See also

 Ada F. Kay
 Arthur Flowerdew
 Arthur Guirdham
 Barbro Karlén
 Joan Grant
 Shanti Devi
 Incarnation
 Karmic astrology
 Planes of existence
 Pre-existence
 Reincarnation in popular culture
 Soulmate

References

External links

 The Columbia Encyclopedia: Transmigration of Souls or Metempsychosis
 The Catholic Encyclopedia: Metempsychosis
 Jewish View of Reincarnation

 
Afterlife
Buddhist philosophical concepts
Druze theology
Esoteric Christianity
Hindu philosophical concepts
Ismaili theology
Jain philosophical concepts
Kabbalah
Philosophy of religion